OFK Vršac is a professional football club based in Vršac, Vojvodina, Serbia. They compete in the Serbian First League, the second tier of the national league system.

History
Founded in April 2007 as OFK Vršac United, the club changed its name to OFK Vršac in December 2017. They subsequently won the Vojvodina League East in the 2017–18 season and took promotion to the Serbian League Vojvodina.

After spending five seasons in the third tier, the club won the title in 2021–22 and took promotion to the Serbian First League for the first time ever.

Honours
Serbian League Vojvodina (Tier 3)
 2021–22
Vojvodina League East (Tier 4)
 2017–18

Seasons

Notable players
This is a list of players who have played at full international level.
  Aleksandar Lazevski
For a list of all OFK Vršac players with a Wikipedia article, see :Category:OFK Vršac players.

Managerial history

References

External links
 Club page at Srbijasport

2007 establishments in Serbia
Association football clubs established in 2007
Football clubs in Vojvodina
Football clubs in Serbia
Sport in Vršac